Anyphops is a genus of wall spiders that was first described by P. L. G. Benoit in 1968.

Species
 it contains sixty-four species, found in Africa and on Saint Helena:
A. alticola (Lawrence, 1940) – South Africa
A. amatolae (Lawrence, 1940) – South Africa
A. atomarius (Simon, 1887) (type) – Southern Africa
A. barbertonensis (Lawrence, 1940) – Somalia, South Africa
A. barnardi (Lawrence, 1940) – Zimbabwe
A. basutus (Pocock, 1901) – Lesotho
A. bechuanicus (Lawrence, 1940) – Botswana
A. benoiti Corronca, 1998 – Madagascar
A. braunsi (Lawrence, 1940) – South Africa
A. broomi (Pocock, 1900) – South Africa
A. caledonicus (Lawrence, 1940) – South Africa
A. capensis (Lawrence, 1940) – South Africa
A. civicus (Lawrence, 1940) – South Africa
A. decoratus (Lawrence, 1940) – South Africa
A. dubiosus (Lawrence, 1952) – South Africa
A. dulacen Corronca, 2000 – Namibia
A. fitzsimonsi (Lawrence, 1940) – South Africa
A. gilli (Lawrence, 1940) – South Africa
A. helenae (Lawrence, 1940) – South Africa
A. hessei (Lawrence, 1940) – South Africa
A. hewitti (Lawrence, 1940) – South Africa
A. immaculatus (Lawrence, 1940) – South Africa
A. karrooicus (Lawrence, 1940) – South Africa
A. kivuensis Benoit, 1968 – Congo
A. kraussi (Pocock, 1898) – South Africa
A. lawrencei (Roewer, 1951) – South Africa
A. leleupi Benoit, 1972 – South Africa
A. lesserti (Lawrence, 1940) – South Africa
A. lignicola (Lawrence, 1937) – South Africa
A. lochiel Corronca, 2000 – South Africa
A. longipedatus (Roewer, 1955) – South Africa
A. lucia Corronca, 2005 – South Africa
A. lycosiformis (Lawrence, 1937) – South Africa
A. maculosus (Lawrence, 1940) – South Africa
A. marshalli (Pocock, 1902) – South Africa
A. minor (Lawrence, 1940) – South Africa
A. montanus (Lawrence, 1940) – South Africa
A. mumai (Corronca, 1996) – South Africa
A. namaquensis (Lawrence, 1940) – Namibia
A. narcissi Benoit, 1972 – Eswatini
A. natalensis (Lawrence, 1940) – South Africa
A. ngome Corronca, 2005 – South Africa
A. parvulus (Pocock, 1900) – Congo, South Africa
A. phallus (Lawrence, 1952) – South Africa
A. pococki (Lawrence, 1940) – South Africa
A. purcelli (Lawrence, 1940) – South Africa
A. regalis (Lawrence, 1940) – South Africa
A. reservatus (Lawrence, 1937) – South Africa
A. rubicundus (Lawrence, 1940) – South Africa
A. schoenlandi (Pocock, 1902) – South Africa
A. septemspinatus (Lawrence, 1937) – South Africa
A. septentrionalis Benoit, 1975 – Cameroon
A. sexspinatus (Lawrence, 1940) – Namibia
A. silvicolellus (Strand, 1913) – Central Africa
A. smithersi (Lawrence, 1940) – Lesotho
A. spenceri (Pocock, 1896) – South Africa
A. sponsae (Lessert, 1933) – Congo, Angola
A. stauntoni (Pocock, 1902) – St. Helena, South Africa
A. stridulans (Lawrence, 1940) – South Africa
A. thornei (Lawrence, 1940) – South Africa
A. transvaalicus (Lawrence, 1940) – South Africa
A. tuckeri (Lawrence, 1940) – South Africa
A. tugelanus (Lawrence, 1942) – South Africa
A. whiteae (Pocock, 1902) – South Africa

See also
 List of Selenopidae species

References

Araneomorphae genera
Selenopidae
Spiders of Africa